In literary interpretation, paratext is material that surrounds a published main text (e.g., the story, non-fiction description, poems, etc.) supplied by the authors, editors, printers, and publishers. These added elements form a frame for the main text, and can change the reception of a text or its interpretation by the public. Paratext is most often associated with books, as they typically include a cover (with associated cover art), title, front matter (dedication, opening information, foreword), back matter (endpapers, colophon) footnotes, and many other materials not crafted by the author. Other editorial decisions can also fall into the category of paratext, such as the formatting or typography. Because of their close association with the text, it may seem that authors should be given the final say about paratextual materials, but often that is not the case. One example of controversy surrounding paratext is the case of the 2009 young adult novel Liar, which was initially published with an image of a white girl on the cover, although the narrator of the story was identified in the text as black. 

The concept of paratext is closely related to the concept of hypotext, which is the earlier text that serves as a source for the current text.

Theory
Literary theorist Gérard Genette defines paratext as those things in a published work that accompany the text, things such as the author's name, the title, preface or introduction, or illustrations. He states, "More than a boundary or a sealed border, the paratext is, rather, a threshold." It is "a zone between text and off-text, a zone not only of transition but also of transaction: a privileged place of pragmatics and a strategy, of an influence on the public, an influence that ... is at the service of a better reception for the text and a more pertinent reading of it". Then quoting Philippe Lejeune, Genette further describes paratext as "a fringe of the printed text which in reality controls one's whole reading of the text". This threshold consists of a peritext, consisting of elements such as titles, chapter titles, prefaces and notes. It also includes an epitext, which consists of elements such as interviews, publicity announcements, reviews by and addresses to critics, private letters and other authorial and editorial discussions – 'outside' of the text in question. The paratext is the sum of the peritext and epitext.

See also 
 Diegesis
 Mimesis

References

Bibliography
 Genette, Gérard: Seuils. Paris: Éditions du Seuil, 1987. (translated as Paratexts. Thresholds of interpretation, Cambridge: CUP, 1997)
 Pellatt, Valerie. Text, Extratext, Metatext and Paratext in Translation. Newcastle upon Tyne: Cambridge Scholars Publishing, 2013.
 Huber, Alexander: Paratexte in der englischen Erzählprosa des 18. Jahrhunderts [Paratexts in eighteenth-century English prose fiction]. (Master's thesis [in German]). Munich: Ludwig-Maximilians-Universität (LMU) München, 1997. [discusses Henry Fielding's Tom Jones, Jonathan Swift's A Tale of a Tub, and Laurence Sterne's Tristram Shandy]
 Müllerová, Lenka: Reklamní aspekty sekundárních knižních textů v devadesátých letech 20. století (Thesis). Available from http://is.muni.cz/th/117754/ff_d/?lang=en;id=121545
 
 
Skare, Roswitha. “The Paratext of Digital Documents.” Journal of Documentation 77, no. 2 (2021): 449–60.

Critical theory
Literary theory
Narratology